Christel Verstegen (born 27 March 1973) is a Dutch archer. She competed at the 1992 Summer Olympics and the 1996 Summer Olympics.

References

1973 births
Living people
Dutch female archers
Olympic archers of the Netherlands
Archers at the 1992 Summer Olympics
Archers at the 1996 Summer Olympics
People from Veghel
Sportspeople from North Brabant
20th-century Dutch women